Sharada Krishnamurthy, popularly known as Kavita Krishnamurthy or Kavita Subramaniam, is an Indian playback and classical singer. She has recorded songs in various Indian languages including Hindi, Bengali, Kannada, Rajasthani, Bhojpuri, Telugu, Odia, Marathi, English, Urdu, Tamil, Malayalam, Gujarati, Nepali, Assamese, Konkani, Punjabi and other languages. She is the recipient of four Filmfare Best Female Playback Singer Awards (winning consecutively during 1995–1997), and the Padmashri which she received in 2005. She was awarded a Doctorate (Honoris Causa) for her contributions to Indian music by Bangalore-based Jain University in 2015. In 1999, she married noted violinist L. Subramaniam and resides in Bengaluru.

Early life 
Born as Sharada  into a Tamil Iyer family in New Delhi to T. S. Krishnamurthy, an employee of the Education Ministry. She began her musical training at the insistence of her aunt, Protima Bhattacharya who enrolled her to train under Surama Basu, where she was taught Rabindra Sangeet. She began her formal training in Hindustani classical music under the guidance of Balram Puri, a classical singer. At the young age of eight, Kavita won a gold medal at a music competition. She won several medals participating in the Inter-Ministry Classical Competition in New Delhi in the mid-1960s.

Career

During her college days at St. Xavier College, Mumbai, she got an opportunity to record a song in the Bengali film Shriman Prithviraj in 1971 with Lata Mangeshkar as co-singer under the auspices of the music composer and singer Hemant Kumar. Although the young Sharada aspired to work in Indian Foreign Services, she moved to Bombay when she was 14 to try her luck as a playback singer in the Hindi film industry.

She is an alumnus of St. Xavier's College, Bombay from where she did her BA Honors Economics. She was very active in St. Xavier's music group. During the annual college festival (Malhar), she met Ranu Mukherjee, the daughter of Hemant Kumar. Ranu took the initiative of reintroducing Kavita to her father. He was impressed by her grounding in music, so he began using her as a singer during his live performances. In one such performance, playback singer Manna Dey spotted her and employed her to sing advertisement jingles. Through her aunt's strong contacts, she met Jaya Chakravarthy, the mother of actress Hema Malini, who later took the initiative of introducing Kavita to the music director Laxmikant (one of the composer duo Laxmikant–Pyarelal) in late 1976.

Playback singing
She recorded her first song under Vilayat Khan's composition in Kadambari (1976). The song was entitled 'Aayega Aanewala' (a remake of Mahal's (1949) superhit song sung by Lata Mangeshkar) and was picturised on Shabana Azmi. Laxmikant gave her an opportunity to work as a dubbing artist. Kavita impressed Laxmikant with her extremely strong grasp of Hindustani classical music. Initially, she recorded songs and cut demos of songs intended for singers like Lata Mangeshkar and Asha Bhosle. In her struggling phase, she received the patronage of music composers Laxmikant—Pyarelal, who backed her so strongly that she was labeled as a singer exclusively working with them. This gave many music directors an excuse to avoid working with her.

In 1978, she first sang the Kannada song "Ondanondu kaaladaga" in the film Ondanondu Kaladalli (Meaning: Once upon a time) directed by Girish Karnad. The song was penned by the Jnanpit awardee Chandrashekhara Kambara and the music by Bhaskar Chandavarkar. Being the only song in the entire movie, Ondanondu kaladaga with its folk touch, became a hit and earned fame for Kavita Krishnamurti. Then she went on to sing many Kannada-language songs.

In 1980, she sang "Kaahe Ko Byaahi" in Maang Bharo Sajana (1980), which featured her singing in her own voice. Unfortunately, the song was dropped from the final cut of the film. In 1985, her career took off with her first major hit, "Tumse Milkar Na Jaane Kyon" from the Hindi film Pyaar Jhukta Nahin (1985) - Tumse milkar. Na Jaane kyun. Post the success of the song, it opened up opportunities beyond the Laxmikant–Pyarelal camp. However, "Hawa Hawaii" and "Karte Hain Hum Pyaar Mr. India Se", two popular songs from the equally popular movie Mr. India (1986) - Karte Hain Hum Pyaar Mr. India se, proved to be a turning point in her career. (The songs were composed by music composers Laxmikant-Pyarelal, the latter being a duet with Kishore Kumar and lip-synced on screen by an actress Sridevi.) Her collaboration with Laxmikant-Pyarelal produced several hits.

The 1990s thrust Kavita into being known as one of the leading female playback singers. Her performance as a singer in the film 1942: A Love Story, composed by R.D. Burman, won her much popular acclaim. With a string of hits from 1942: A Love Story, Yaraana, Agni Sakshi, Bhairavi, and Khamoshi, Kavita established herself as one of the leading female playback singers alongside Alka Yagnik. She went on to work with several music directors of the 1990s Hindi films, such as Bappi Lahiri, Anand–Milind, A. R. Rahman, Rajesh Roshan, Raamlaxman, Ismail Darbar, Himesh Reshammiya, Aadesh Shrivastava, Nadeem-Shravan, Jatin–Lalit, Viju Shah and Anu Malik. Her work with A. R. Rahman and Ismail Darbar remain some of the most critically acclaimed renditions of the last two decades. During her stint as a playback singer, she sang duets with the leading male singers of her time. Early in her career, she sang duets with Kishore Kumar, Mohammed Rafi, and Shailendra Singh. Her most prolific work was with the leading singers of the 1990s: Amit Kumar, Mohammad Aziz, Udit Narayan, Kumar Sanu, and Abhijeet Bhattacharya. She has also sung with younger singers in the 2000s such as Sonu Nigam, Shaan, and Babul Supriyo. Her female duets mostly have been with Alka Yagnik, Anuradha Paudwal and Sadhana Sargam with a few duets also with Lata Mangeshkar and Asha Bhonsle.
During the 90s and early 2000s, Kavita alongside Alka Yagnik sang the most for leading ladies.

As she actively started exploring fusion music, Kavita traveled around the world, including the US, UK, UAE, Europe, Africa, Australia, East Asia, the Middle East, and South America. She performed in concert halls including Royal Albert Hall in London, The Kennedy Center in Washington, D.C., Madison Square Garden, The Lincoln Center in New York City, the Zhongshan Music Hall in Beijing, The Esplanade in Singapore, The Putra Jaya World Trade Centre in Kuala Lumpur, and Gewandhaus Leipzigm.

Although primarily a playback singer, Kavita has sung with orchestras as a soloist; she collaborated with Western artists from jazz, pop and classical fields. She has lent her voice for many albums. As a playback singer, Kavita has performed throughout India. In 2014, she also sang "Koi Chahat Koi Hasrat" for the album Women's Day Special: Spreading Melodies Everywhere. It was composed by Nayab Raja and penned by Dipti Mishra.

In Kannada
Kavita's playback singing career started with Kannada-language films. Her first film song was in the Kannada film Ondanondu kaladalli (1978) with the same title. She sang many hit songs in Kannada since then. Songs such as "Bareyada mounada Kavithe" (Sparsha), "Hoove Hoove" (H2O), "Endo Kanda kanasu" (Lankesh Patrike), "O Malle o dumbi" ('Naga Devate'), "Artha madkolo" (Shishya), "Kaveri Kaveri" (Raja Huli), and many more hit songs made her a household name in Karnataka.

Pop and devotional singing
Due to her participation in fusion and pop music, Kavita has lent her voice for several pop and devotional albums. The most prominent ones being:
 Bhalobasi
 Shiv Baba ko Yaad Kar
 Dujone Dekha Holo
 Together Tagore
 Premer Neshay
 Mohe Raam Dhun Laagi
 Bhajan Stuti
 Aadi Ganesh
 Venkatesha Suprabhatam
 Shiva Shlokas
 Koi Akela Kahan
 Meera Ka Ram
 Mahalakshmi Stotram
 Pop Time
 Sai Ka Vardaan
 Shagufthagi
 Dil Ki Awaaz
 Hasratein
 Athens
 Asmita
 Mahiya

Television appearances
Kavita Subramaniam made many appearances in various music reality shows as a guest judge because of her popularity as a playback singer. She recently was a judge for Bharat Ki Shaan: Singing Star (Season 1), which aired on DD National at prime time. She also appeared in Vijay TV Airtel Super Singer and Star Jalsha Super Singer.
She has also sung for serials like Alif Laila {1980} DD National, Mahabharat, Ramayan (1986), Shri Krishna, and Ramayan (2008), Kavita Krishnamurthy At Know In 2017 Special Juries and Judge UAE Singers of Student, The Give as Prices 5,000 Dinar In Winner.
She also appeared in Rising Star Season 2, which was broadcast on Colors TV on 4 March 2018 as a guest.

Personal life
Kavita Krishnamurti married L. Subramaniam in Bengaluru, Karnataka on 11 November 1999. They have a child called Sai Prashant Krishnamuthy.

Subramaniam has four children from his previous marriage. His eldest daughter Gingger Shankar is a singer, composer, and multi-instrumentalist, while his second eldest, Bindu Subramaniam is a law graduate and singer-songwriter. Narayana is a doctor, while the youngest, Ambi Subramaniam, is an accomplished violinist.

Kavita and her husband opened a musical institute, the Subramaniam Academy of Performing Arts, in Bengaluru in 2007. In March 2013, she launched her own app which is available for free download in the App Store and the Google Play Store.

Discography

Awards and nominations

 2015 - Honorary Doctorate from Jain University, Bangalore
 2000 - Accolades for her include the “Best Singer of the Millennium” award at the Stardust Millennium 2000 Awards
Civilian Awards
 2005 – Padma Shri – India's fourth-highest civilian honors

Filmfare Awards
 2003  – Best Female Playback Singer (shared with Shreya Ghoshal) – "Dola Re Dola" (Devdas)
 1997 – Best Female Playback Singer – "Aaj Main Upar" (Khamoshi: The Musical)
 1996 – Best Female Playback Singer – "Mera Piya Ghar Aaya" (Yaraana)
 1995 – Best Female Playback Singer – "Pyaar Hua Chupke Se" (1942: A Love Story)

State Awards
 2000 - Maharashtra State Film Award for Best Female Playback Singer - for the songs in the movie Sawai Hawaldar.

Star Screen Awards
 1997 – Best Female Playback Singer – "Aaj Main Upar" (Khamoshi: The Musical)
 2000 – Best Female Playback Singer – "Hum Dil De Chuke Sanam" (Hum Dil De Chuke Sanam)

Zee Cine Awards
 2003 – Best Female Playback Singer (shared with Shreya Ghoshal) – "Dola Re" (Devdas)
 2000 – Best Female Playback Singer – "Nimbooda" (Hum Dil De Chuke Sanam)

IIFA Awards
 2001 - Best Female Playback Singer - "Aey Dil laya Hai Bahar" (Kya Kehna)
 2003 – Best Female Playback Singer (shared with Shreya Ghoshal) – "Dola Re Dola" (Devdas)

 ITA Awards
 2008 - Best Female Playback Singer  (Durga Puja).

 GIMA Awards
 2010 - Best Female Playback Singer  (Best Fusion Album).

 MMA Awards
 2021 - Jury Prize (Album Of The Decade / Rockstar 2011).

Other Awards
 Prafulla Kar Samman (2018) Odia Film Industry.
 Muhammad Rafi Award (2021).
 ‘Phonomenal That's Me’'' award for her contribution to the Kannada film industry (2014) 
 Swaralaya Yesudas Award (2008) by Swaralaya, for exceptional contribution to Indian music.
 Kishore Kumar Journalists'/Critics' Award in Calcutta (2002)
 Lion's / Club Bollywood Award, held in New York (2000) At The Same year (2002)
 Shri Ravindra Jain Sangeet Samman (2012)
 Lata Mangeshkar Award from the Govt. of Madhya Pradesh (2005)

See also 
 L. Subramaniam
 Girish Karnad
 Padmavati Rao
 Prabhat Samgiita 
 List of Indian playback singers

References

External links

 
 L. Subramaniam and Kavita S.
 Artist: Kavita Krishnamurthy on Google Music
 Kavita Krishnamurthy's Tribute To Jagjit Singh

Living people
Assamese playback singers
Bollywood playback singers
Kannada playback singers
Tamil playback singers
Telugu playback singers
Indian women playback singers
Tamil singers
Bengali singers
Nepali-language singers from India
Marathi playback singers
Marathi-language singers
Recipients of the Padma Shri in arts
People from New Delhi
Year of birth missing (living people)
Indian folk-pop singers
Women musicians from Delhi
Singers from Delhi
Filmfare Awards winners
Screen Awards winners
Zee Cine Awards winners
International Indian Film Academy Awards winners
20th-century Indian women singers
20th-century Indian singers
21st-century Indian women singers
21st-century Indian singers